Lierse Kempenzonen is a Belgian association football club located in Lier, in the province of Antwerp. The club, founded in 1943 as Oosterzonen in Oosterwijk, was relocated to Lier following the bankruptcy of Lierse in 2018. They compete in the Belgian First Division B, the second tier of Belgian football.

History 
The club was founded in 1943 as FC Oosterzonen from a commune within Westerlo and started in the Belgian provincial leagues where it hovered between the various levels, most of the times playing at the 6th or 7th level of the Belgian football pyramid. In 2007, 2008 and 2009, the club managed to win the title three seasons in a row to promote for the first time in its history into the national levels of football. In the Belgian Fourth Division, the club managed to avoid relegation for a few seasons, before managing another promotion in the 2012-13 season into the Belgian Third Division. Following the reform of Belgian football in 2016, the team started playing in the Belgian First Amateur Division.

In May 2018, it was announced that the club would relocate to Lier, as it merged with the old board of Lierse (a club which had gone bankrupt just a few weeks before) to form a new club called Lierse Kempenzonen. The new team continued with the old logo of Lierse and started playing in the Herman Vanderpoortenstadion in Lier.

Current squad

Coaching Staff

References

External links 
 
 KFC Oosterzonen Oosterwijk at Soccerway

1943 establishments in Belgium
Association football clubs established in 1943
Football clubs in Belgium
Lier, Belgium
Sport in Antwerp Province